Żdżary may refer to the following places:
Żdżary, Konin County in Greater Poland Voivodeship (west-central Poland)
Żdżary, Turek County in Greater Poland Voivodeship (west-central Poland)
Żdżary, Września County in Greater Poland Voivodeship (west-central Poland)
Żdżary, Lesser Poland Voivodeship (south Poland)
Żdżary, Łowicz County in Łódź Voivodeship (central Poland)
Żdżary, Opoczno County in Łódź Voivodeship (central Poland)
Żdżary, Wieruszów County in Łódź Voivodeship (central Poland)
Żdżary, Lublin Voivodeship (east Poland)
Żdżary, Grójec County in Masovian Voivodeship (east-central Poland)
Żdżary, Radom County in Masovian Voivodeship (east-central Poland)
Żdżary, Subcarpathian Voivodeship (south-east Poland)
Zdżary (formerly Żdżary), Subcarpathian Voivodeship (south-east Poland) 
Żdżary, West Pomeranian Voivodeship (north-west Poland)